Joyzelle Joyner (August 27, 1905 – November 30, 1980) was an American actress and dancer. She appeared in at least thirty films between 1925 and 1935, garnering some notoriety for her appearance in The Sign of the Cross.

Career
Joyner began appearing in films around 1924 or 1925, often playing dancers. Her first major role in a major motion picture came in 1930, when she appeared as twin queens of Mars, Boo Boo and Loo Loo in Just Imagine. Her role as Ancaria in The Sign of the Cross, a major production directed by Cecil B. deMille, drew attention from censors; in the film, she performed the lesbian-overtoned "Dance of the Naked Moon".

The scene was eliminated from the re-released 1935 version of the film, but reinserted in 1993 for the MCA-Universal video version. That same year, she had prominent roles in two westerns, Whistlin' Dan for Tiffany Pictures, and The Vanishing Frontier (starring Johnny Mack Brown) for Paramount Pictures.

Most of Joyzelle's work after 1932 constituted uncredited parts, though she did appear under the name "Laya Joy" in House of Mystery, a horror film for Monogram Pictures. Her last-known screen appearance, in Dante's Inferno (1935), was uncredited, but did afford her the opportunity to show off her dancing skills.

Personal life
Joyner was born in Alabama and had a younger brother, Clarence. According to U.S. census records, Clarence was living in California in 1930 with a wife, Lois.

Her first marriage was to Dudley V. Brand. The two became estranged over Joyner's acting career pursuit. During an argument on August 11, 1927, Brand fired two shots through a closed bedroom door, one shot injuring Joyner in the arm. Clarence Joyner was on hand to protect his sister by restraining Brand. Joyner's second marriage was to film director Phil Rosen in 1929.

She died in Orange, California on November 30, 1980, aged 75.

Filmography

References

External links

Photograph at gettyimages

1905 births
1980 deaths
American female dancers
Dancers from California
American silent film actresses
American film actresses
Actresses from Alabama
Place of birth missing
20th-century American actresses
20th-century American dancers